Pamela Anne Quin (born 18 October 1962 in Edinburgh, Midlothian) is a former Scottish international cricketer whose career for the Scottish national side spanned from 2000 to 2001. She had played a women's one-day internationals

References

External links
 
 

1962 births
Living people
Scotland women One Day International cricketers
Scottish women cricketers
Cricketers from Edinburgh